Robert Eugene Allen (January 25, 1935 – September 10, 2016) was an American telecommunications businessman.

He was the president of AT&T between 1986 and 1988. He also served as its CEO and chairman from 1988 to 1997. During this period, he incorrectly forecasted the future of the telecom industry and lacked strategic direction; as a result, AT&T suffered severe losses and lost $12 billion in a few months in 1997. 50,000 employees were then laid off. Because of this, Condé Nast Portfolio ranked Allen as the 12th worst American CEO of all time in April 2009.

Born in Joplin, Missouri, Allen grew up in New Castle, Indiana. He graduated from Wabash College in Crawfordsville, Indiana with his bachelor's degree in political science in 1957.  While a student at Wabash, he was initiated into the Indiana Beta chapter of the Phi Delta Theta fraternity.

He was elected a fellow of the American Academy of Arts and Sciences in 1994. From 1990 he served on the board of Pepsico. He also served on the governing board of the Mayo Clinic. He served as chairman of The Business Council in 1993 and 1994.

References

External links

1935 births
2016 deaths
People from Joplin, Missouri
People from New Castle, Indiana
Wabash College alumni
PepsiCo people
Fellows of the American Academy of Arts and Sciences
American chairpersons of corporations
20th-century American businesspeople